In Germanic paganism, Tamfana is a goddess. The destruction of a temple dedicated to the goddess is recorded by Roman senator Tacitus to have occurred during a massacre of the Germanic Marsi by forces led by Roman general Germanicus. Scholars have analyzed the name of the goddess (without reaching consensus) and have advanced theories regarding her role in Germanic paganism.

Attestations
In book 1, chapters 50 and 51 of his Annals, Tacitus says that forces led by Germanicus massacred the men, women, and children of the Marsi during the night of a festival near the location of a temple dedicated to Tanfana:

There is no undisputed testimony of this goddess besides the passage in Tacitus. An inscription  Tamfanae sacrum  was found in Terni, but is considered a falsification by Pyrrhus Ligorius. She is also mentioned, as Zamfana, in the supposed  Old High German lullaby, which was accepted by Jacob Grimm but is now also considered a forgery.

Theories and interpretation
Since fana is Latin for "temples," it has been suggested that it was a temple to a god Tan, shortened from the German word for a pine tree, Tanne, or that the first element meant "collective."   Smith believes it was a Wotanfana, a temple of Wodan. The division of the word was rejected by Grimm among others; he called the name "certainly German," the -ana ending being also found in Hludana, Bertana, Rapana, and Madana.

The passage is one of few to contradict Tacitus' own statement in Germania that the Germanic tribes did not have temples. Wilhelm Engelbert Giefers proposed that Tanfana derived from tanfo, cognate with Latin truncus, and referred to a grove on the site of the Eresburg, related to the Irminsul.

Many suggestions have been made about the goddess' name and nature. Grimm was unable to interpret it, but suggested variously that it was connected to Stempe, a name of Berchte, that she was named for an association with a sieve, and, based on the now discredited lullaby, that her name meant "bountiful, merciful." Based on folklore and toponymy, Friedrich Woeste proposed that the name was cognate with German zimmern and meant "builder" or "nourisher"; based on the season at which the festival and the Roman attack took place, Karl Müllenhoff proposed she was a goddess of harvest plenty, properly *Tabana, cognate with Greek words for "expenditure" and (hypothetically) "unthrifty"; others added Icelandic and Norwegian words for "fullness, swelling," "to stuff," and "large meal." A. G. de Bruyn, a scholar of Oldenzaal folklore, returned to splitting the name into Tan and fana on toponymic grounds and because of a stamp dated 1336 found near Ommen that shows a woman holding a fir tree flanked by a sun symbol and a catlike creature and a bird; he proposed that she was a moon or a mother goddess, perhaps related to the Carthaginian goddess Tanit. He and more recently Rudi Klijnstra relate Tanfana, or Tan, to legends surrounding de Groote Steen te Oldenzaal (the Big Stone at Oldenzaal) in the area of Overijssel; the stone was originally located on a hill called Tankenberg, the highest point in the area, but was later moved into the city.

Rudolf Simek notes that an autumnal festival aligns with Old Norse attestations of the dísablót, a celebration of the dísir, female beings with parallels to the West Germanic cult of the Matres and Matronae. Simek says that Tamfana is perhaps best considered in the context of the widespread veneration of the Germanic Matres and Matronae.

See also
 Baduhenna, a Germanic goddess mentioned by Tacitus in his Annals
 "Isis" of the Suebi, a Germanic goddess mentioned by Tacitus in his Germania
 Nerthus, a Germanic goddess mentioned by Tacitus in his Germania
 Regnator omnium deus, a Germanic god mentioned by Tacitus in his Germania

Notes

References

 Church, Alfred John. Brodribb, William Jackson (Trans.) (1876). Annals of Tacitus. MacMillan and Co.
 Frost, Percival (1872). The Annals of Tacitus. Whittaker & Co.
 Simek, Rudolf (2001 [1993]). Dictionary of Northern Mythology. D. S. Brewer.

Germanic goddesses
Marsi (Germanic)